Rabieh is a suburban area on the northern edge of Greater Beirut, Lebanon, about 13 kilometers driving distance from Beirut. It is located in the foothills of Mount Lebanon, on the road to Bikfaya. Rabieh saw its population increase sharply in the late 1980s, following the Lebanese civil war. Rabieh is famous for its biodiversity and ecological richness.

Rabieh has a geo-strategic location, it is only 15 to 20 minutes away from the vibrant capital Beirut, and is a minute's drive from the Bikfaya highway.

Despite its proximity to the capital, Rabieh's population density is relatively low. It is situated at 200–300 m above sea level.

External links
Localiban.org:  Rabiyeh

References 

Greater Beirut
Rabieh
Armenian communities in Lebanon
Maronite Christian communities in Lebanon